Tinsel Town Rebellion is a double live album released by Frank Zappa in May 1981. The album was conceived by Zappa after he scrapped the planned albums Warts and All and Crush All Boxes, and contains tracks that were intended for those albums.

Overview
The lyrical themes varyingly focus on human sexuality, popular culture and other topics. The title track is a satire of the punk rock scene, describing a band that adopts the punk style to get a record deal. The album also contains reworked recordings of older Zappa songs, including "Love of My Life," "I Ain't Got No Heart," "Tell Me You Love Me," "Brown Shoes Don't Make It" and the third release of "Peaches en Regalia" (appropriately titled "Peaches III").

Production 

Tinsel Town Rebellion was formed out of two albums - Warts and All and Crush All Boxes - that Zappa originally planned to release following the establishment of his home studio, the Utility Muffin Research Kitchen. Warts and All was intended to be a triple live album, while Crush All Boxes would have consisted largely of studio recordings. As Warts and All reached completion, Zappa found the project to be "unwieldy" due to its length, and scrapped it, later conceiving Crush All Boxes. During the final stages of Crush All Boxes, Zappa decided to salvage the scrapped Warts and All album by releasing a series of albums which used the planned material to emphasize his various talents: You Are What You Is, Tinsel Town Rebellion and two series of live albums, Shut Up 'n Play Yer Guitar and You Can't Do That on Stage Anymore.

The opening track, "Fine Girl" is a studio recording originally intended for the unreleased album Crush All Boxes, along with an early mix of the live track "Easy Meat". The Tinsel Town Rebellion version of "Easy Meat" featured much heavier studio overdubs than the version prepared for Crush All Boxes.  Zappa wrote "Easy Meat" in 1970 and the song was a concert staple of the early 1970s Mothers of Invention line-up featuring ex-members of The Turtles: Mark Volman and Howard Kaylan on lead vocals.

The front cover art for Tinsel Town Rebellion retains the Crush All Boxes title, with the new album title spray painted over it. The sleeve and interior was designed by Cal Schenkel, and contains still images from the film Freaks, directed by Tod Browning.

The majority of Tinsel Town Rebellion consists of overdub-free live recordings from the 1979 and late-1980 concert tours. This album marks the first appearance by guitarist Steve Vai. The album also introduces drummer David Logeman, who played drums from March through July on the 1980 tour, on the tracks "Fine Girl" and "Easy Meat". He would also be the sole drummer on the album You Are What You Is.

Release history 

The album was reissued on a single CD by Rykodisc in 1990. (An unauthorized CD had been previously issued by EMI in England in 1987.) Complaints regarding the significantly inferior sound quality (the album was mastered by Bob Stone) led to a remaster by Spencer Chrislu in 1998. Universal Music Group released a new remaster in 2012.

The 1990 release omitted the applause that Zappa had edited onto the endings of "For The Young Sophisticate" and "Pick Me I'm Clean" to end the album sides. The 1998 release restored the applause and included crossfades from the concluding songs of each side to the songs beginning the following side. The 2012 CD release includes the full applause endings with fadeouts as they had occurred on the original vinyl LP.

Reception 

Allmusic writer Steve Huey praised the album's instrumental work and the reworked versions of older songs, but described the sexually-themed lyrics as "problematic".

Track listing
All songs written, composed and arranged by Frank Zappa.

Personnel

Musicians
 Frank Zappa – lead guitar, vocals
 Arthur Barrow – bass & vocals
 Vinnie Colaiuta – drums
 Warren Cuccurullo – rhythm guitar & vocals
 Bob Harris – keyboards, trumpet & high vocals
 David Logeman – drums on "Fine Girl" and first half of "Easy Meat"
 Ed Mann – percussion
 Tommy Mars – keyboards & vocals
 Patrick O'Hearn – bass on "Dance Contest"
 Steve Vai – rhythm guitar & vocals
 Denny Walley – slide guitar & vocals
 Ray White – rhythm guitar & vocals
 Ike Willis – rhythm guitar & vocals
 Peter Wolf – keyboards

Production staff
 Frank Zappa – arranger, producer
 Joe Chiccarelli – engineer
 George Douglas – engineer
 Tommy Fly – engineer
 Jo Hansch – mastering
 Thomas Nordegg – everything remote
 Mark Pinske – chief engineer
 Cal Schenkel – cover art
 Allen Sides – engineer
 Bob Stone – remixing, remastering, digital remastering (1990 edition)
 Spencer Chrislu - digital remastering (1996 edition)
 John Williams – graphics

Charts
Album - Billboard (United States)

References

1981 live albums
Albums produced by Frank Zappa
Barking Pumpkin Records albums
Frank Zappa live albums